The qualification for the 1972 Men's Olympic Handball Tournament assigned quota places to sixteens teams: the host, seven teams from the world championships, four continental champions and six teams from the World Olympic qualification tournaments respectively.

Qualification summary

Legend for qualification type

Host country

World Championship

Asian qualification tournament

American qualification tournament

European qualification tournament

African qualification tournament

References

Men's qualification
Handball Men
Olympics